The encapsulins are a family of bacterial proteins that serve as the main structural components of encapsulin nanocompartments. There are several different encapsulin proteins, including EncA, which forms the shell, and EncB, EncC, and EncD, which form the core.

References 

Cell biology
Metabolism
Biological engineering
Bacterial proteins